The Hansa-Brandenburg W.23 was a German flying boat fighter of World War I.

Design
The W.23 followed the design philosophy for all flying boat biplanes built by Hansa-Brandenburg, including a swept lower wing, wing floats, pusher engine arrangement, and a single-step hull. Although similar to design to the Hansa-Brandenburg W.18, it differed in having a longer fuselage. Three aircraft (MN 1647-1649) were delivered from June 1917 to January 1918, but flight characteristics were deemed poor.

Operators

Kaiserliche Marine (Marinefliegerkorps)

Specifications

See also

References

Bibliography

W.23
1910s German fighter aircraft
Flying boats
Biplanes
Single-engined pusher aircraft
Aircraft first flown in 1917